Football Club Goa is an Indian professional football club based in Goa, that competes in the Indian Super League, the top flight of Indian football. The club was established on 26 August 2014. Nicknamed as Gaurs, the club plays their home matches at the Fatorda Stadium in Margao.

Brazilian coach Zico was the first manager of the club. Its marquee players for its first two seasons have been French winger Robert Pires and Brazilian defender Lúcio respectively. The team finished the league stage in the second position in their first season. In the end-of-season play-offs, they lost via a penalty shootout against Atlético de Kolkata in the semi-finals after a goalless draw. The next year, the team came first in the league stage, then lost the final 3–2 to Chennaiyin FC at home.

In the 2018–19 season, they reached their second final in the league where they lost 1–0 to Bengaluru FC. In the same season, they beat Chennaiyin FC 2–1 in the 2019 Indian Super Cup to win their first national trophy. In the 2019–20 season, FC Goa topped the league stage and won the first ever ISL League Winners Shield and directly qualified for the AFC Champions League group stage. The club changed from blue shirts and shorts to an orange colour scheme in 2018 which has been used ever since.

History

Inception
One of the traditional powerhouse regions of Indian football, Goa was bound to be one of the cities to participate in the Indian Super League from its inception. In early 2014, it was announced that the All India Football Federation, the national federation for football in India, and IMG-Reliance would be accepting bids for ownership of eight of nine selected cities for the upcoming Indian Super League, an eight-team franchise league modelled along the lines of the Indian Premier League and Major League Soccer in the United States. On 13 April 2014, it was announced that Venugopal Dhoot had won the bidding for the Goa franchise along with Dattaraj Salgaocar and Shrinivas Dempo. The club was officially launched on 26 August 2014 at a well-attended ceremony at the Goa Marriott Resort and Spa in Miramar. The club represents Goa, the only state to declare football as its official sport. The logo of the club represents Goa's state animal the Gaur, while the colours blue and orange symbolizes the Goan coastline and sunrise.

On 23 September 2014, Indian cricketer Virat Kohli was unveiled as one of the co-owners. Bollywood actor Varun Dhawan was chosen as the brand ambassador of the club.
FC Goa is the first Indian sports club to launch a satellite TV channel – FC Goa TV on Videocon D2H.

Zico era (2014–2016)

Brazilian footballer Zico signed as the club's head coach on 2 September 2014. On 20 September 2014, FC Goa officially confirmed Premier League winner and former Arsenal footballer Robert Pires as their first marquee player. On 15 October 2014, FC Goa played their first Indian Super League match against Chennaiyin FC at the Fatorda Stadium, Goa. FC Goa lost four out of their first six matches but came back strongly in the second half of the tournament with five victories from their last eight encounters keeping five clean sheets in their 14 matches. Overall, Zico has done a remarkable job with six wins, four defeats and four draws, which took them to the second spot of the standings with 22 points. By finishing second in the league, the club qualified for the end-of-season play-offs, where they lost via a penalty shootout against Atlético de Kolkata in the semi-finals after a goalless draw. Particularly encouraging from the first season was the arrival of Romeo Fernandes on the national footballing scene. The Goan's consistent displays on the pitch quickly turned him into a fan favourite and attracted interest from lands as far as Brazil. His performances culminated in him being loaned out to Atletico Paranaense from parent club Dempo SC, where he became the first Indian to play professionally at the senior level in South America.
FC Goa enjoyed a stellar 2015 season in the Indian Super League. Head coach Zico continued as the head coach of the franchise for a second successive year. After a good run in the 2014 season, much was expected from the team. Zico lined up an impressive team ahead of the season with veteran players like Leonardo Moura, Reinaldo Oliveira, and former La Masia youth product, Joffre Mateu who won the first season of the ISL with Atletico de Kolkata joining the ranks. Frenchman, Gregory Arnolin was the only international player retained from the first season with the club. The Indian contingent had familiar faces in Goan wingers Romeo Fernandes and Mandar Rao Dessai and goalkeeper Laxmikant Kattimani.
FC Goa started the season in superb fashion with a commanding 2–0 victory over Delhi Dynamos and that set the tone for the season ahead. Under Zico's tutelage, FC Goa played an attacking brand of football and set the league alight as they finished the league stage of the campaign on top of the standings with 25 points, two clear of the second placed team with 7 victories along the way. In the process, FC Goa scored the most goals in the league stage, having netted 29 times. En route to the semi-finals, the Gaurs earned the record of having attained the highest margin of victory when they beat Mumbai City FC 7–0 in Fatorda. This victory included two players scoring hat-tricks (Dudu Omagbemi and T. Haokip) which was a first in the history of the league. After a 1–0 loss in the first leg of the semi-finals against Delhi Dynamos, FC Goa turned the tie on its head with a dominating 3–0 win at home. This provided them with a chance to win the ISL title at the Jawaharlal Nehru Stadium in Fatorda in front of the home fans. In the finals, a late surge by Chennaiyin FC saw FC Goa lose out on the title after a well contested match.

On 23 July 2016, Salgaocar and Dempo stepped down from the ownership of FC Goa. On 5 August 2016, new owner Jaydev Mody brought a 65% stake in the FC Goa team. Head coach Zico continued as the head coach of the franchise for his third and final season. FC Goa had a poor 2016 season after finishing last in the table and picking up only four victories throughout the season. They ended the disappointing season with 14 points and finished last in the table. Zico primarily blamed late preparations for FC Goa's failure which was caused due to the incoming of new owners just a few months before the start of the new season. His 3-year contract with FC Goa ended and did not renew it with the club.

Success under Lobera (2017–2020) 

In the 2017–18 season, FC Goa won their first match of the 2017–18 Indian Super League 2–3 away against Chennaiyin, this was also their first competitive match under new coach Sergio Lobera, they later went on to lose against Chennayin FC in the semi-finals. Lobera in his second season led Goa to their second final against Bengaluru FC which they lost 0–1 after a late goal from Rahul Bheke in the second half of extra time. In the same season, Goa beat Chennaiyin FC 2–1 in the finals of the 2019 Indian Super Cup to win their first trophy. On 1 February 2020, Goa announced they mutually parted ways with head coach Sergio Lobera and his coaching staff after playing 15 games in the third season. Goa later went on to win the remaining three league games and topped the group stage and won the ISL League Winners Shield, they also became the first Indian club to qualify for AFC Champions League group stage in its current format. However, their 5–6 defeat on aggregate to Chennaiyin FC in the playoffs ended their chance of winning the elusive ISL trophy.

Recent history (2020–2021) 
On 30 April 2020, Goa appointed Juan Ferrando as their head coach ahead of the new season. The club also announced their partnership with RB Leipzig for the youth development. The club had an impressive stint in the first year under coach Juan until they bowed in the semi finals of 2020–21 Indian Super League season.

Under the guidance of Ferrando, FC Goa scripted history after scoring their first ever goal in the AFC Champions League on 20 April against Persepolis FC through a header by Edu Bedia. They finished third in Group E with 3 points ahead of Al Rayyan. In the competition, Dheeraj Singh made a whopping 26 saves in five matches to top the goalkeeping chart of the West Zone group stage.

Goa participated in the 130th edition of Durand Cup and reached to the final, defeating Bengaluru FC 7–6 in sudden death. On 3 October 2021, they clinched their first ever Durand Cup title defeating Mohammedan SC 1–0. On 19 December 2021, club president Akshay Tandon announced that head coach Juan Ferrando had triggered his release clause to join ISL club ATK Mohun Bagan. On 21 December 2021, Derrick Pereira was appointed as the head coach.

Carlos Pena Era (2022–present) 
On 16 April 2022, Fc Goa appointed Carlos Pena as the head coach. He played his first match as manager against East Bengal and won his first game as the manager.

Stadium

The Pandit Jawaharlal Nehru Stadium in Margao, better known as The Fatorda is the home stadium of Goa. The stadium has hosted many international games, including India national team's qualifiers for both the FIFA World Cup and AFC Asian Cup. It was also one of the six host venues for the 2017 FIFA U-17 World Cup held in India.

The stadium opened in 1989. In 2014, it has been refurbished and upgraded according to the latest FIFA specifications to host the Lusofonia Games in 2014. It is designed with a 20,000 seating capacity. With a roof covering 100 percent of the seating area, the stadium complex provides two levels of fans seating arrangement along with a VIP area.

Supporters

Fans in the state spend the night outside the Nehru Stadium in Fatorda in the hope of grabbing a couple of tickets for FC Goa's home matches. Streets were painted blue, music was played and some people painted their car bonnets with the crest of the team, during the ISL. FC Goa Fan Club and East Lower Army are the officially recognized supporters clubs of FC Goa. FC Goa celebrity supporters include Anushka Sharma, Sonakshi Sinha, Zayed Khan, and Raveena Tandon.

Colours and badges
The official mascot, the first of its kind in the ISL, is named "Philly the Gaur". He's a Gaur, which happens to be the state animal. FC Goa were the first out of the 10 clubs to have a mascot. There are also two other unofficial mascots namely "Gaurreddo", introduced by FC Goa Fan Club in 2014, followed by "Gaurdinho" in 2015, launched by a general football group TFDO.

Colours
During the early years, the club wore an all blue kit with orange colour coming lightly on the sides. The all blue kit were used until 2017-18 season, when the club adopted the all orange kit.

Kit evolution

Kit manufacturers and shirt sponsors

FC Goa in the media
FC Goa TV is the dedicated official channel for FC Goa. The channel first launched on 10 October 2014 on Videocon D2H channel 100. FC Goa TV includes buildup to matches, post-match shows, exclusive interviews with players and staff besides an interactive section which gives fans the chance to get some answers from first team players.

FC Goa launched its magazine Forca Goa at Fatorda Stadium, on 1 November 2014. The magazine was unveiled by All India Football Federation President Praful Patel in the presence of brand ambassador of FC Goa Varun Dhawan, supporter Sonu Nigam and co-owners Venugopal Dhoot, Anirudh Dhoot, Dattaraj V. Salgaocar and Shrinivas V. Dempo.

Ownership
The club is owned by Goan Football Club Pvt. Ltd. which used to consist of Dattaraj Salgaocar (37% stake) and Shrinivas Dempo (37% stake), which in 2016 was bought by Jaydev Mody (65% stake), Venugopal Dhoot (23% stake) and Virat Kohli (12% stake).

Current owners

 Jaydev Mody is the Chairman of Delta Corp Limited, the company focused in gaming (casinos) and hospitality mainly in Goa.
Virat Kohli, Indian national men's cricket team former captain, is also one of the co-owners.
Akshay Tandon is an entrepreneur who took over FC Goa in August 2016 as the President and Co-Owner of the club. Since the took over, he has built a youth program, set up the Forca Goa Foundation addressing the challenges with grassroots football in the state of Goa and established a style of play.

Former owners

 Shrinivas Dempo served as the President of Dempo Sports Club Private Limited. The club was owned and sponsored by the Dempo group of companies. He has been named amongst the 50 most influential people in Indian sports in the annual Sports Illustrated Power list.
 Dattaraj Salgaocar is the Managing Director of VM Salgaocar Corporation. Salgaocar FC is owned and managed by VM Salgaocar and Company to give a platform to the Goan youth to showcase their talent to the country and to the world.
 Venugopal Dhoot is the Chairman of Videocon, and has been its Managing Director since 2005.

Players

First-team squad

Other players on contract

Out on loan

Reserves and youth

Youth football
FC Goa has a reserve side which is fielded in the I-League 2nd Division. It also has a women's team which was announced on 28 July 2018. It also has youth teams for various age group football tournaments and Youth I-League.

Grassroots
FC Goa's grassroots development programme which commenced in February 2015, saw FC Goa reaching out to over 20,000 children. FC Goa has a robust grassroots development programme. Over 1500 children between the age groups of 6 to 14 are currently being groomed by FC Goa. The U-14 team, the Junior Gaurs are doing excellently well. FC Goa assigned coach Gavin Araujo, an AFC A license coach as its Head of the youth development and Katz Naidoo as the program's Technical Director. The adopted 16 schools include St Anthony's High School (Duler), St Anthony's HS (Guirim), Saraswat HS (Mapusa), St Britto's HS (Mapusa), Assagao Union School, St Joseph's HS (Calangute), Pilar Central School, and St Lawrence HS (Agassaim) in the North. Our Lady of Poor HS (Tilamol), Our Lady of Fatima HS (Rivona), St Joseph HS (Chandor), Assumpta HS (Sarzora), Fr Agnel Ashram HS (Verna), St Rita HS (Maina), St Rock HS (Velim), and St Xavier HS (Velim) are the schools which have been adopted by FC Goa from the South.

Reserves Squad

Personnel

Current technical staff

Management

Statistics and records

Continental record

Affiliated clubs
The following club is currently affiliated with FC Goa:
 RB Leipzig (2020–present)
The following clubs were affiliated with FC Goa:
 Dempo SC (2014–2016)
 Salgaocar FC (2014–2016)

Honours

League
 Indian Super League
Premiership (1): 2019–20
Runners-up (2): 2015, 2018–19
 Goa Professional League
Champions (1): 2018–19

Cup

 Super Cup
Winners (1): 2019
 Durand Cup
Winners (1): 2021
Goa Police Cup
Winners (1): 2019

AFC club ranking

eSports
The organizers of ISL introduced eISL, a FIFA video game tournament, for the ISL playing clubs, each represented by two players. FC Goa hosted a series of qualifying games for all the participants wanting to represent the club in eISL. On 20 November the club announced the signing of the two players.

Roster

See also
 List of FC Goa records and statistics
 List of FC Goa players
 List of FC Goa seasons
 Indian football clubs in Asian competitions

References

External links

FC Goa at ISL

 
Football clubs in Goa
Association football clubs established in 2014
Indian Super League teams
2014 establishments in Goa